Karen Elizabeth Stives (November 3, 1950 – August 14, 2015) was an American eventing competitor and Olympic champion.

Olympics
Stives qualified for the 1980 U.S. Olympic team but did not compete due to the U.S. Olympic Committee's boycott of the 1980 Summer Olympics in Moscow, Russia. She was one of 461 athletes to receive a Congressional Gold Medal instead. At the 1984 Olympic Games in Los Angeles, Stives anchored the United States team that received a gold medal in Team eventing, and also an individual silver medal.

References

External links
Karen Stives' obituary

1950 births
2015 deaths
American female equestrians
Equestrians at the 1984 Summer Olympics
Olympic gold medalists for the United States in equestrian
American event riders
Medalists at the 1984 Summer Olympics
Congressional Gold Medal recipients
21st-century American women